SuperYacht Business was a yachting magazine published by TI Media six times a year. It is edited by Juliet Benning.

History
In an interview with the Guardian newspaper in 2002 IPC Media's chief executive, Sly Bailey, blamed the economic downturn for a fall in sales in their portfolio of magazines with a focus on luxury brands, such as super yachts.

Front covers
Front covers have included:
 Nobiskrug
 Andrew Winch   
 Dickie Bannenberg (Bannenberg Designs)

References

External links
 

Bi-monthly magazines published in the United Kingdom
Sports magazines published in the United Kingdom
English-language magazines
Magazines established in 2006
Sailing magazines
Yachts
Watercraft